is a passenger railway station in located in the city of Kumano, Mie Prefecture, Japan, operated by Central Japan Railway Company (JR Tōkai).

Lines

Station layout
The station consists of a single side platform serving bi-directional traffic. The small wooden station building dates from the original construction of the line.The station is unattended.

Platforms

History 
Nigishima Station opened on 15 July 1959 as a station on the Japan National Railways (JNR) Kisei Main Line.  The station has been unattended since 21 December 1983. The station was absorbed into the JR Central network upon the privatization of the JNR on 1 April 1987.

Passenger statistics
In fiscal 2019, the station was used by an average of 19 passengers daily (boarding passengers only).

Surrounding area
 Kumano City Hall Arasaka Branch Office
 Nigishimacho Public Hall
 Nigishima Fishing Village Center
 Kumano City Arasaka Elementary School
 Kumano City Arasaka Junior High School

See also
List of railway stations in Japan

References

External links

  JR Central timetable 

Railway stations in Japan opened in 1959
Railway stations in Mie Prefecture
Kumano, Mie